Gonichthys barnesi, or Barne's lanternfish, is a species of ray-finned fish within the family Myctophidae. It is found in subtropical waters within the southern hemisphere at depths of 425 to 1000 meters during the day, and at depths of 0 to 175 meters at night. It grows to a length of 5 centimeters.

Conservation 
Gonichthys barnesi has been classified as 'Least concern' by the IUCN Red list. There are no known major threats to the species, and no conservation efforts have been made so far.

Synonymised names 
Placed by the World Register of Marine Species.

 Gonichthys bamesi Whitley, 1943
 Myctophum coruscans Richardson, 1845

References 

Myctophidae
Fish described in 1943
IUCN Red List least concern species
Fish of the Atlantic Ocean
Fish of the Pacific Ocean
Fish of the Indian Ocean